The 1951–52 Czechoslovak Extraliga season was the ninth season of the Czechoslovak Extraliga, the top level of ice hockey in Czechoslovakia. 18 teams participated in the league, and ZSJ Vitkovicke zelezamy won the championship.

Group A

Group B

Group C

Final round

External links
History of Czechoslovak ice hockey

Czechoslovak Extraliga seasons
Czech
1951 in Czechoslovak sport
1952 in Czechoslovak sport